The Railyard is a 50-acre arts district in Santa Fe, New Mexico."Railyard", Tourism Santa Fe

It contains:
 Santa Fe Depot (Rail Runner station) 
 SITE Santa Fe gallery and performance space
 Santa Fe Farmers' Market
 El Museo Cultural de Santa Fe
 the 13-acre Railyard park

References

External links
Official website
 Railyard Arts District website
Official website of the Railyard Park

Geography of Santa Fe County, New Mexico
Arts districts